is a Japanese manga series created by Fujiko Fujio. The manga began as a one-shot series serialized in Shogakukan's Big Comic magazine on 1968, later becoming a full-fledged series published by Jitsugyo no Nihon Sha's Manga Sunday magazine from 1969 to 1971. The manga tells the story of a salesman named Moguro Fukuzou, whose job is to help people fill gaps in their soul. In reality, he often ruins the lives of his clients if they do not follow his strict instructions or if they betray his trust.

It is notable in Japan as the only series by the Fujiko Fujio duo to be darker and more mature in its themes than their previous works. An anime adaptation was produced by Shin-Ei Animation, directed by Toshirō Kuni and written by Yasuo Tanami. It aired on TBS from October 10, 1989 to December 28, 1993 with a total of 127 episodes. A second anime adaptation aired on Tokyo MX from April 3 to June 19, 2017.

Plot
Society is filled with people who struggle through their lives or never achieved their goals. The stories in the series focus on individuals who meet a shadowy and ominous salesman named . Moguro promises to "fill your empty soul" and give them a better life, if they follow his advice or agree to his conditions. However, once Moguro's clients begin to enjoy the fruits of their new life, they often breach their conditions, betray his trust, or deny that they received assistance at all. When this invariably happens due to their avarice, greed or selfishness, Moguro punishes his clients by using their reliance on his aid against them. With their lives ruined, he believes that they have been justly rewarded and he looks for more potential clients that he can help in a similar way.

The names of Moguro's clients are often puns on their situation or predicament, or refer to aspects of Japanese culture or history. For example in Episode 18, the name of the client, Urashima Taichi, alludes to the legend of Urashima Tarō, a type of Japanese Rip Van Winkle.

Media

Manga
Fujiko Fujio first created the manga as a one-shot called  in Shogakukan's Big Comic magazine in 1968. However the manga was deemed too scary for the publisher, and he ended up publishing the work in Jitsugyo no Nihon Sha's Manga Sunday magazine from 1969 to 1971, under the same title as the one-shot. The fourth sequel, ran in Jitsugyo no Nihon Sha's Manga Sunday from 2001 to 2004. Both the Chuokoron-Shinsha version and The Salesman Returns have been published in both physical and digital formats, with volume 1 of the bunkobon edition of the former and volume 1 of the latter including the previously uncollected chapters from The Black Salesman. As of 2021, The Dancing Salesman chapters have yet to be collected in a tankōbon.

Anime

An anime adaptation of the manga was produced by Shin-Ei Animation and aired as part of the 1989–1992 variety show  on TBS from October 10, 1989 to September 29, 1992 and later continued as 2 hour specials which aired from December 26, 1992 to December 28, 1993. It was directed by Toshirō Kuni and written by Yasuo Tanami, while Kōhei Tanaka composed the music. The opening song is titled  while the ending is titled , both performed by Tomio Umezawa.

A DVD boxed set of the series was released by Pony Canyon on March 20, 2013. The anime has also been digitally remastered and released on various video on demand streaming services in Japan.

A second anime adaptation titled  was also produced by Shin-Ei Animation. It was directed by Hirofumi Ogura, with Naohiro Fukushima, Asami Ishikawa and Midori Natsu writing the scripts and Kohei Tanaka composing the music. Fujio Suzuki designed the characters and served as chief animation director. Minoru Nishida was the art director, with Akiko Inoue in charge of color design. The series aired on Tokyo MX from April 3, 2017, to June 19, 2017. It was streamed on Crunchyroll, making it first The Laughing Salesman material available online outside Japan. The opening song is titled "Don't" by NakamuraEmi while the ending theme is titled  by Junji Takada.

Video games
Compile released the first video game based on the series for the MSX2 in Japan in 1991.

A visual novel of the series was released on the Sega CD in Japan on September 17, 1993. It was also developed by Compile and published by Sega, adapting three episodes of the anime. In the game, it features fully-voiced cutscenes with 2D artwork and as they progress through, they will go through some mini-games, related to the episode (e.g. following Moguro by choosing the correct path). The player can change the outcome of the events of the customer. If the player makes the right choices, the customer can have a happy ending. However, if the player makes the wrong choices, the customer will get the bad ending, just like in the anime.

Fukuzou Moguro makes an appearance as a guest character in the 2012 game Girls RPG Cinderelife developed by Level-5 for the Nintendo 3DS.

Live-action drama
A live-action adaptation was produced by TV Asahi, which stars Shirō Itō as Moguro Fukuzou. It aired from June 26 to September 18, 1999.

Reception
In June 1999, the manga sold more than 3.5 million copies in Japan alone.

Notes

References

External links
 
 
 
 

1990s Japanese television series
2017 anime television series debuts
Anime series based on manga
Dark comedy anime and manga
Fujiko Fujio A
Jitsugyo no Nihon Sha manga
Manga adapted into television series
Psychological thriller anime and manga
Seinen manga
Shin-Ei Animation
TBS Television (Japan) original programming
Tokyo MX original programming
TV Asahi original programming
TV Asahi television dramas